Spruille Braden (March 13, 1894 – January 10, 1978) was an American diplomat, businessman, lobbyist, and member of the Council on Foreign Relations. He served as the ambassador to various Latin American countries, and as Assistant Secretary of State for Western Hemisphere Affairs. He is notable for his interventionist activities and his prominent role in several coups d'état.

Early life
Born in Elkhorn, Montana, Braden was the son of a leading engineer at Anaconda Copper Company's properties in Chile, William Burford Braden.   He attended Montclair Kimberley Academy and Yale, earning a degree in engineering in 1914. He was a mining engineer and consultant to governments in Latin America, returning to the US in 1920.

Braden first came to prominence as one of the owners of the Braden Copper Company in Chile and as a shareholder in the United Fruit Company. He also directed the W. Averell Harriman Securities Corporation. As an agent of Standard Oil, he played a role in the Chaco War between Bolivia and Paraguay and espoused an openly anti-union position.

Braden was a delegate to the Montevideo Convention (Seventh International Conference of American States) in Montevideo, Uruguay in 1933, where he sat with Secretary of State Cordell Hull; former American ambassador to Mexico J. Reuben Clark; American minister to Uruguay J. Butler Wright; and University of Chicago professor Sophonisba Breckinridge.

Latin American diplomatic roles

He held several brief but important ambassadorships in Colombia (1939–1942), Cuba (1942), and Argentina. As ambassador to Argentina for four months in 1945, Braden encouraged the opposition against President Edelmiro Julián Farrell and Juan Perón. Perón exploited his intervention with a slogan, Braden o Perón ("Braden or Perón"), which contributed to Perón's victory in the presidential election the following year.

Braden accused Perón of being pro-Axis and anti-United Nations, and of plotting against Allied interests in South America, including the protection of industrial and commercial Axis assets and massive violations of human rights.

In 1945, Braden served as Assistant Secretary of State for Western Hemisphere Affairs under Harry Truman. He clashed with George S. Messersmith, former ambassador to Mexico, with whom he had many disagreements about foreign policy in Latin America. The disagreement with Braden would eventually force Messersmith out of the foreign service.

Beginning in 1948, Braden was a paid lobbyist for the United Fruit Company. When the company's interests were threatened in Guatemala by President Jacobo Arbenz Guzmán, Braden helped to conceive and execute the 1954 coup d'état that overthrew him. In his first act as newly-ignaugurated President of Nicaragua on May 1, 1967, Anastasio Somoza Debayle conferred Nicaragua's highest decoration, the Grand Cross of Ruben Dario, on Ambassador Spruille Braden and his wife Verbena for their "unstinting efforts in the cause of freedom in all of Latin America".

Later life
Braden served as president of the Metropolitan Club of New York, founded in 1891 by J. P. Morgan, from 1967 to 1973.

He died in Los Angeles of a heart ailment after unsuccessfully lobbying against the Torrijos–Carter Treaties.

Works
Diplomats and Demagogues: The Memoirs of Spruille Braden, Arlington House, 1971,

See also
United Fruit Company
Peronism

References

Works cited
Scenna, Miguel A. (1974), Braden y Perón, Buenos Aires: Korrigan.
Frank, Gary (1980). Juan Peron vs. Spruille Braden : the story behind the blue book. Lanham, MD : University Press of America
Trask, Roger R. Spruille Braden versus George Messersmith: World War II, the Cold War, and Argentine Policy, 1945–1947 in the Journal of Interamerican Studies and World Affairs, Vol. 26, No. 1 (Feb., 1984), pp. 69–95

External links

Democracy’s Bull, TIME Magazine, November 15, 1945

1894 births
1978 deaths
Montclair Kimberley Academy alumni
United States Assistant Secretaries of State
People from Jefferson County, Montana
Ambassadors of the United States to Cuba
Ambassadors of the United States to Argentina
Ambassadors of the United States to Colombia
Burials at Gate of Heaven Cemetery (Hawthorne, New York)
20th-century American diplomats
Yale University alumni